F. Murray Abraham
 Rosie Malek-Yonan
 Terrence Malick
 Fares Fares
 Josef Fares
 Winter Jones, previously Tony Yalda, sometimes credited as Anthony Yalda

References

Assyrian